Andrew Stewart North (born March 9, 1950) is an American professional golfer who had three wins on the PGA Tour, including the U.S. Open twice. Since 1992, he has served as a golf analyst for ESPN.

Early years
North was born in Thorp, Wisconsin, and raised in Monona, Wisconsin. He attended Monona Grove High School, graduating in 1968. While still in high school, he lost in the final match of the Wisconsin State Amateur Match Play Championship at Merrill Hills Country Club. Two years later, he won the 1969 Wisconsin State Amateur Championship at Westmoor Country Club in Brookfield, Wisconsin by defeating Archie Dadian in the match play final.

College career
North accepted an athletic scholarship to attend the University of Florida in Gainesville, Florida, where he played for coach Buster Bishop's Florida Gators men's golf team from 1969 to 1972. He was a three-time first-team All-Southeastern Conference (SEC) selection, and an All-American in 1970, 1971 and 1972. North graduated from Florida with a bachelor's degree in business administration in 1972, and was later inducted into the University of Florida Athletic Hall of Fame as "Gator Great."

Professional career
North turned professional in 1972. He had a moderately successful career on the PGA Tour made remarkable by the fact that two of his three wins on the Tour were in the U.S. Open. The first PGA Tour win of North's career came at the 1977 American Express Westchester Classic. He was 28 years old when he won the 1978 U.S. Open at Cherry Hills Country Club in Cherry Hills Village, Colorado. He moved into the lead after the second round, and was one shot ahead going into Sunday, but an erratic final round left him needing to make a five on the last hole to take the championship. He struggled up the 18th, finding the rough twice and then landing in a greenside bunker, but he made a four-foot putt to win by one stroke over J. C. Snead and Dave Stockton.

At the 1985 U.S. Open, on the South Course at Oakland Hills Country Club in Bloomfield Hills, Michigan, North found himself two shots behind Chen Tze-chung of Taiwan going into the final round, but three shots clear of the rest of the field. Chen moved into a four-shot lead early, but threw the tournament wide open by shooting a quadruple bogey eight on the fifth hole. The lead swung between North, Chen, Denis Watson, Payne Stewart, and Dave Barr, who had surged into contention, but North went into the last hole with a two-shot lead, and his bogey five was enough to give him a second major championship.

North played on the 1985 Ryder Cup team. In 1990, he won the PGA Grand Slam of Golf. Since turning 50 in 2000, North has played intermittently on the Champions Tour. His best finish at this level is a win at the 2008 Liberty Mutual Legends of Golf.

Broadcast career
In 1992, North joined ESPN as an on-course reporter. In 2004, he was promoted to the lead on-course reporter for ESPN and ABC Sports. He also has been the lead analyst on ESPN's golf studio shows with host Scott Van Pelt since 2003. According to ESPN, his preview shows for major championships have been so in-depth that Tour players have been known to watch them to help with course strategy. From 2003 to 2014, North concluded his U.S. Open preview show by dressing up in a doctor's outfit and using an often modified formula to pick the winner of the tournament. North eliminates groups of players who he believes will not win by writing them on large white placards which he then tosses over the edge of the set. In addition, North occasionally serves as a substitute analyst for Wisconsin Badgers men's basketball radio broadcast. He was elected to the Wisconsin Athletic Hall of Fame in 1998.

Amateur wins (2)
1969 Wisconsin Amateur
1971 Western Amateur

Professional wins (15)

PGA Tour wins (3)

South American wins (1)
1980 Center Open

Other wins (5)

Champions Tour wins (1)

Champions Tour playoff record (0–1)

Other senior wins (5)
2000 Liberty Mutual Legends of Golf (with Jim Colbert) 
2001 Liberty Mutual Legends of Golf (with Jim Colbert) 
2005 Liberty Mutual Legends of Golf - Raphael Division (with Tom Watson)
2006 Liberty Mutual Legends of Golf - Raphael Division (with Tom Watson)
2007 Liberty Mutual Legends of Golf - Raphael Division (with Tom Watson)

Major championships

Wins (2)

Results timeline

CUT = missed the halfway cut
"T" indicates a tie for a place.

Summary

Most consecutive cuts made – 7 (1974 PGA – 1977 Masters)
Longest streak of top-10s – 1 (five times)

Results in The Players Championship

CUT = missed the halfway cut
"T" indicates a tie for a place

U.S. national team appearances
Professional
Ryder Cup: 1985
World Cup: 1978 (winners)

See also

1972 PGA Tour Qualifying School graduates
List of American Ryder Cup golfers
List of Florida Gators men's golfers on the PGA Tour
List of golfers with most PGA Tour wins
List of University of Florida alumni
List of University of Florida Athletic Hall of Fame members

References

External links

Andy North's ESPN Bio

American male golfers
Florida Gators men's golfers
PGA Tour golfers
PGA Tour Champions golfers
Winners of men's major golf championships
Ryder Cup competitors for the United States
Golf writers and broadcasters
Golfers from Wisconsin
People from Thorp, Wisconsin
People from Monona, Wisconsin
Sportspeople from Madison, Wisconsin
1950 births
Living people